Chicago Metro can refer to:

Chicago metropolitan area
Chicago 'L', the rapid transit system in Chicago
Metro Chicago, a music venue